Lepidochrysops oosthuizeni, Oosthuizen's blue, is a species of butterfly in the family Lycaenidae. It is found in Lesotho and South Africa, where it is found on high altitude grassland and Nama Karoo on the Witteberg in the East Cape and the Maluti Mountains in Lesotho and the eastern Orange Free State.

The wingspan is 33–37 mm for males and 34–38 mm for females. Adults are on wing from December to January. There is one generation per year.

The larvae feed on Selago galpinii.

References

Lepidochrysops
Insects of South Africa
Fauna of Lesotho
Butterflies described in 1983
Butterflies of Africa
Taxonomy articles created by Polbot